Dwayne Chin-Quee, better known as Supa Dups, is a Jamaican record producer, a drummer, and selector based in Miami, Florida. He is a member of the Black Chiney sound system. His father is a second generation Chinese Jamaican, and his mother is of Hakka Chinese, German, and African descent.

Biography
In 2004, Supa Dups appeared on Nina Sky's album by producing their hit record 'Turnin' Me On'. Later that year he appeared on Beenie Man & Capleton's albums. In 2005, his releases only increased as he produced on Akon's album, David Banner's album, Rihanna's album & Pitbull's album. He then went on to produce 2 singles off of Collie Buddz' album, followed by Estelle's single 'Come Over' ft. Sean Paul.

In 2008 he produced multiple songs on John Legend's album and Kardinal Offishall's album.

He went on to produce Mary J. Blige's worldwide single 'Each Tear' that charted around the world, with remixes in many different countries. He appeared on Bruno Mars' album 'Doo-Wops & Hooligans' as the only guest producer with the songs 'Our First Time' & 'Liquor Store Blues' ft. Damian Marley.

In February 2011, he won on his first Grammy album with his production of 'W.T.P.' on Eminem's Recovery album.

Supa Dups earned his second Grammy nomination "Album of the Year" for Bruno Mars 'Doo-Wops & Hooligans' set to be held at The Staples Center in Los Angeles on 12 February 2012.

In 2012, he produced minor parts of Snoop Lion's album Reincarnated alongside Major Lazer.

As of 10 February 2013 Supa Dups was on his 2nd Grammy winning album for his contribution on Drake's 'Take Care' for Best Rap Album.

26 January 2014 Supa Dups was on his 3rd Grammy winning album for Bruno Mars – Unorthodox Jukebox for "Best Pop Vocal Album"

The release of SOJA's Amid the Noise and Haste in August 2014 marked the first ever full-length album that Supa Dups has chosen to work on, as well as the first live band that he's worked with.

Production discography

Albums

2004
Nina Sky – Nina Sky – 04. "Turnin' Me On"
Beenie Man – Back to Basics – 10. "Eloh" 12. "Pussy Language"
Capleton – Reign of Fire – 12. "Who You Callin' Nigga"
2005
Sean Paul – The Trinity – 15.  "Straight Up"
David Banner – Certified – 18. "Shake That Booty" (Krumpa Remix) [iTunes Bonus Track] (featuring Elephant Man)
Rihanna – Music of the Sun – 4. "You Don't Love Me (No, No, No)" (featuring Vybz Kartel)
Pitbull - Money Is Still a Major Issue – 6. "Turnin Me On (Remix)" – Nina Sky featuring Pitbull & Shawnna
2006
Beenie Man – Undisputed – 13. "Set You Free"
Tami Chynn – Out of Many...One – 14. "Hot!!!"
2007
Collie Buddz – Collie Buddz – 2. "Blind To You" 4. "Tomorrow's Another Day"   10. "Sensimillia" ft. Roache
Notch – Raised By the People – 6. "Layaway Love"8. "Traemelo"11. "Ella Se Fue"13. "No Problema"15. "Mano y Mano"16. "Verme" (Caribbean Remix) featuring Baby Ranks17. ""Chévere" (Remix) – featuring Voltio 18. "Burn Out Bad Mind"
Wayne Wonder – Foreva – 15. "L.O.V.E"
2008
Estelle - Shine – 6. "Come Over" (featuring Sean Paul)
Kardinal Offishall – Not 4 Sale – 7. "Numba 1 (Tide Is High)" (featuring Rihanna)9. "Nina"
John Legend – Evolver – 7. "No Other Love" (featuring Estelle)14. "Can't Be My Lover" (featuring Buju Banton)
Shontelle – Shontelligence – 6. "Life Is Not an Easy Road"
2009
Kardinal Offishall – Mr. International – 1. "Clear"
Sean Paul – Imperial Blaze – 18. "Straight From My Heart" – Co Production
Mary J. Blige – Stronger with Each Tear – 7. "Each Tear"
2010
Eminem – Recovery – 5. "W.T.P"
Bruno Mars – Doo-Wops & Hooligans – 3. "Our First Time"8. "Liquor Store Blues"
2011
Bad Meets Evil – Hell: The Sequel – 2. "Fast Lane"
Elephant Man - "Dance & Sweep! Adventures of the Energy God" -  "07. "Clear" (featuring Kardinal Offishall)
Cris Cab – "Foreword EP" –  "02."Better Off Running" "06."How Was I To Know"
Pushim – "Milestone" – "02."Mr.Teaser" (Japan)
DA & the Supa Dups – Black Chiney Orchestra – 00. "Who Do You Know" 00."Too Cool" (feat. Vybz Kartel)
2011: Drake – Take Care" – 7. "Buried Alive Interlude" (feat. "Kendrick Lamar")

2012
Stacy Barthe – "In The Inbetween" EP "1."Find Your Way" "3."No Strings Attached" "9."Keep It Like It Is
Cris Cab – "Echo Boom" EP –  "In My Dreams"
Tyga – "Careless World: Rise of the Last King" – 22."Still Got It"  (feat. Drake)
Melanie Fiona – "The MF Life" –  Deluxe edition "17. " Like I Love You"
Cover Drive – "Bajan Style" – "09."Can't Live in a World" (UK)
Chris Rene – "I'm Right Here" – "03."Back from the Dead"
Cody Simpson – "Paradise" – "05."Tears"
Christina Aguilera – "Lotus" – "10."Around the World"
Bruno Mars – Unorthodox Jukebox' – "08."Show Me"

2013
Snoop Lion – "Reincarnated" – "08."Smoke the Weed"
Jay Sean – "Neon" – "14."Sucka for You" 
Juicy J – "Stay Trippy" – 18."Having Sex" (featuring Trina and 2 Chainz)
Tiara Thomas – "Dear Sallie Mae" – "Tell Me Something"

2014
Tessanne Chin – "Count on My Love" – "Everything Reminds Me of You"
The Dirty Heads – "Sound of Change" – "03."Medusa Feat: (Ward 21)" "08."Radio"
SOJA – "Amid The Noise And Haste"- 03."I Believe" Feat:"Nahko Bear", & "Michael Franti" -02."Your Song" Feat: Damian Marley "05."-"Shadow" Feat: Trevor Young of SOJA"-"04."Easier Ft. Anuhea And J-Boog"
Chris Webby - Chemically Imbalanced'' - 07."Brim Low"-15."Stand Up"

2015
Akon - "Stadium" (Island) - Just A Man Featuring Stephen Marley
Kid Ink - "Full Speed (album)" Deluxe - "Show Must Go On" (featuring MGK and Math Allen)
Sublime with Rome - "Sirens" - 02. "Where Did You Go" - 05."Been Losing Sleep"
Collie Buddz - "Blue Dreamz" - "06"Repeat" - "07."My Prescription"
R.City - "What Dreams Are Made Of" - 12."Crazy Love" (featuring Tarrus Riley)
2016
Rebelution - "Falling Into Place" - 01."Know It All" 02."Inhale Exhale" (featuring Protoje) 03."Upper Hand"  04."Lay My Claim"  06."Santa Barbara" (featuring Shashin K) 07."Those Days"  08."Free Up Your Mind"  10."High on Life" 
Michael Franti - "Soul Rocker" Entire Album Co-Produced with Stephen (Di Genius) McGregor & Michael Franti
Drake - "Views" - "11."Controlla" - "16."Too Good" (featuring: Rihanna)
Kid Ink - "Nasty" (featuring:Jeremih, Spice) additional production
PartyNextDoor - "PartyNextDoor 3" - 04. "Not Nice"
Black M - "Éternel insatisfait" - "Comme moi" (featuring: Shakira)
The Hamilton Mixtape - "Usher" - "04."Wait for it
2017
Collie Buddz - "Good Life" 01."Control" 02."Lovely Day" 03."Part Of My Life" 04."Save Me From The Rain (Feat: Kat Dahlia)" 05."Good Life" 06."I Got You" 10."Glass House"
Nicky Jam - "Fénix" 08"No Te Puedo Olvidar" 19."I Can't Forget You"
Shakira - "El Dorado" - 02."Nada" 05."Amarillo" 08."Comme Moi" (with Black M) 12."What We Said" (Comme Moi English Version) (featuring MAGIC!)
Drake - "Signs" 
2018
Amara La Negra - "Insecrue"
Nicki Minaj - "Bed" Feat: Ariana Grande
Estelle - "Lovers Rock - 02."Meet Up" (feat:Maleek Berry) 03."Really Want" (feat:Konshens & Nick X Navi) 13."Love Like Ours" (feat: Tarrus Riley) 14."Good for Us"
Kranium "Sidung"
Becky G - "Zooted" Feat: French Montana & Farruko
2019
Becky G - "LBD"
Mozart La Para - “Barbaro”
Becky G - "Greenlight Go"
Anitta & Becky G - Kisses - "Banana"
Bad Gyal - "Hookah"
Becky G - "Secrets"
Sean Paul - "When It Comes to You"
Six60 - “Raining”

Singles

"Turnin' Me On" – Nina Sky
"Father Elephant" – Elephant Man
"Kill The Dance" – Akon featuring Kardinal Offishall – B Side – Akon's – "Lonely" single
"Clothes Off" – Nina Sky
"Blind To You" – Collie Buddz
"Tomorrow Is Another Day" – Collie Buddz
"Layaway Love Remix" – Notch featuring Fatman Scoop
"Mary Jane (High Grade!)" – Collie Buddz (Promo Single)
"Nande" – Minmi featuring Rudeboy Face (Japan Only)
"Numba 1 (Tide Is High)" – Kardinal Offishall featuring Keri Hilson
"Come Over" – Estelle featuring Sean Paul
"Somebody Come Get Me" – Melanie Fiona – Sad Songs – EP (UK Only)
"Island Boy" – Melanie Fiona – Sad Songs – EP (UK Only)
"No Other Love" – John Legend featuring Estelle
"Each Tear" – Mary J. Blige
"Clear! (Remix)" – Kardinal Offishall
"Clear! (Remix)" – Kardinal Offishall featuring Elephant Man
"Favorite DJ II" – Clinton Sparks featuring Sean Paul, Ricky Blaze & Supa Dups
"Fast Lane" – Bad Meets Evil
"Like I Love You" – Melanie Fiona
"Still Got It" – Tyga (feat. Drake)
Tiara Thomas – "Dear Sallie Mae" – "Tell Me Something"
Tessanne Chin – "Count on My Love" – "Everything Reminds Me of You"
SOJA – "Nahko", & "Michael Franti" – "I Believe" 
SOJA – "Your Song" Feat: Damian Marley
Michael Franti - "Once A Day" Feat: Sonna Rele
Drake - "Controlla"
Drake - "Too Good" (featuring: Rihanna)
PartyNextDoor - " Not Nice"
Black M - "Éternel insatisfait" - "Comme moi" (featuring: Shakira)
Drake - "Signs" 
Amara La Negra - "Insecrue"
Nicki Minaj - "Bed" Feat: Ariana Grande
Estelle - "Love Like Ours" (feat: Tarrus Riley)
Becky G - "Zooted" Feat: French Montana & Farruko

Remixes

"Amber" (Supa Dups Remix) – 311 featuring Ward 21
"Yo (Excuse Me Miss)" (Reggae Remix) – Chris Brown
"Unfaithful" (Reggae Remix) – Rihanna (featuring Shontelle)
"Umbrella" (Dancehall Remix) – Rihanna (featuring Vybz Kartel) (Japan)
"It Don't Make Any Difference To Me" (Reggae Remix) – Kevin Michael (featuring Collie Buddz)
"No Substitute Love" (Reggae Remix) – Estelle (featuring Half Pint)
"No Other Love" / "Can't Be My Lover" – Cool Breeze Mixes – John Legend (2009) Remix Single Digital Download
1. "No Other Love" – John Legend (featuring Estelle)
2. "No Other Love" (Di Genius Remix)
3. "No Other Love" (Curtis Lynch Remix)
4. "No Other Love" (Jus Bus Remix)
5. "Can't Be My Lover" – John Legend (featuring Buju Banton)
6. "Can't Be My Lover" (Curtis Lynch Remix)
"Oh Yeah" Dancehall Remix – Jaicko (Featuring Vybz Kartel)
"Oh Yeah" Reggae Remix – Jaicko (Featuring Snoop Dogg)
"Raggamuffin" Remix – Selah Sue Featuring J. Cole (2012)
"Watch Out For This (Bumaye)" Supa Dups x Black Chiney Remix – Major Lazer Featuring Busy Signal (2013)

Riddims

Kopa Riddim (2004)
Higher Octane Riddim (2006)
Drumline/Timeline Riddim (2007)
Doctor Bird Riddim (2008)

Compilations

"Reggae Gold 2003" – No Letting Go – Wayne Wonder/LL Cool J (remix) – Remixed By: Supa Dups, Joel Chin
"Reggae Gold 2005" – Turnin' Me On – Nina Sky/Cham (Black Chiney Reggae remix) – Produced By: Supa Dups, Cipha Sounds
"Ragga Ragga Ragga 2005" – Turnin' Me On – Nina Sky/Cham (Black Chiney Reggae remix) – Produced By: Supa Dups, Cipha Sounds
"Fabriclive.24 [LIVE]" – Diplo – Turnin' Me On – Nina Sky – Produced By: Supa Dups, Cipha Sounds
"Miami Shine – Blast Star Di Blazing Fire" (2007) – Nande – Minmi featuring Rudebwoy Face (Japan) – Produced By: Supa Dups
"True Reflections...A New Beginning" (2007) – Jah Cure – Track 9: "Jamaica" & Track 13: "The Sound" – Produced By: Danja Zone/Supa Dups
"Miami Shine – UPRISING" (2008) – Blast Star
"Reggae Gold 2008" – Blind To You – Collie Buddz – Produced By: Supa Dups
"Reggae Gold 2008" – Somebody Come Get Me – Melanie Fiona (aka Syren) – Produced By: Supa Dups, Mitchum "Khan" Chin & Willy Chin
"WWE The Music, Vol. 8" (2008) – "S.O.S." (performed by: Collie Buddz) Kofi Kingston – Produced By: Supa Dups
"Reggae Gold 2009" – "Come Over" (featuring Sean Paul) – Estelle- Produced By: Supa Dups

Music videos

"Come Over" – Estelle featuring Sean Paul
"Nina" – Kardinal Offishall
"Numba 1 (Tide Is High)" – Kardinal Offishall featuring Keri Hilson
"Clear!" – Kardinal Offishall
"Each Tear" – Mary J. Blige
"Favorite DJ II" – Clinton Sparks featuring Sean Paul, Ricky Blaze & Supa Dups
"Liquor Store Blues" – Bruno Mars Featuring Damian Marley
"Fast Lane" – Bad Meets Evil
"Still Got It" – "Tyga" Featuring "Drake"
"Keep It Like It Is" – "Stacy Barthe"
2013: "Smoke The Weed" – Snoop Lion featuring Collie Buddz
2017"Comme moi" Black M (featuring: Shakira)"

References

External links
Black Chiney's official website
Supa Dups' MySpace

Hip hop record producers
Jamaican people of German descent
Jamaican people of Chinese descent
American people of Chinese descent
Jamaican record producers
Musicians from Kingston, Jamaica
Musicians from Miami
Living people
Hakka musicians
1976 births